Zatín is a village and municipality in the Trebišov District in the Košice Region of eastern Slovakia.

External links

Villages and municipalities in Trebišov District
Hungarian communities in Slovakia